Donskoy is a Russian surname. Notable people with the surname include:

Alexander Donskoy (born 1970), mayor of Arkhangelsk, Russia
Boris Donskoy (1894 or 1896–1918), Russian revolutionary
Dmitry Donskoy (1350–1389), Grand Prince of Moscow (1359–1389) and Grand Prince of Vladimir (1363–1389)
Evgeny Donskoy (born 1990), Russian professional tennis player
Joonas Donskoi (born 1992), Finnish professional ice hockey player
Mark Donskoy (1906–1985), Soviet film director

Russian-language surnames